The Invisible Woman is a 2013 British biographical drama film directed by Ralph Fiennes and starring Fiennes, Felicity Jones, Kristin Scott Thomas and Tom Hollander. Written by Abi Morgan, and based on the book of the same name by Claire Tomalin, the film is about the secret love affair between Charles Dickens and Nelly Ternan, which lasted for thirteen years until his death in 1870. The film premiered at the Telluride Film Festival on 31 August 2013, and was released in the United Kingdom on 7 February 2014. The film received a Best Costume Design nomination (Michael O'Connor) at the 86th Academy Awards.

Plot
In 1857, eighteen-year-old English actress Ellen "Nelly" Ternan (Felicity Jones) is noticed by the forty-five-year-old Charles Dickens (Ralph Fiennes) while she is performing at London's Haymarket Theatre. Soon after, he casts her, along with her mother (Kristin Scott Thomas) and sister Maria (Perdita Weeks), in a performance of The Frozen Deep by Wilkie Collins at Dickens' Free Trade Hall in Manchester. At a party following the performance, the famous author and the actress share a brief moment alone.

Sometime later, Nelly and her family attend one of Dickens' readings at the Harrow Speech Room in London. Afterwards, Dickens is delighted to see Nelly again. Soon after, Dickens takes the Ternan family to Doncaster Racecourse and begins to spend more time with them. Having become disillusioned with his wife, who does not share his energy and passion for literature and ideas, Dickens cherishes his time with the young actress who shares his interests and passions. Nelly, in turn, loves spending time with the famous novelist.

Early one morning, Dickens walks from Gads Hill Place, his country home, to East London to see Nelly perform in a play. Her mother invites him back to their cottage. Noticing the shared looks between Dickens and her daughter, Mrs. Ternan later cautions him that she cannot afford to put her daughter's reputation at risk. Dickens assures her that he has no intention of compromising her good name. After organising a reading and fundraiser to benefit London's "fallen women" and their children, Dickens invites the Ternan family to his town house, where Nelly examines with fascination the author's books, manuscripts, and writing instruments. When they are alone, they share details and secrets about their lives and upbringings, and they grow closer.

Later, Mrs. Ternan confides to her eldest daughter Fanny her feelings about the growing bond between Nelly and Dickens, how their relationship may offer Nelly the kind of stable future she would not find in the theatre, knowing that Nelly is not as talented as her sisters. Overhearing the conversation, Nelly is angered and confused by her mother's plans for her to become the mistress of a married man. Soon after, Dickens' wife Catherine (Joanna Scanlan) visits Nelly at her home to deliver a jeweled bracelet birthday gift from her husband, which had been delivered to her by mistake. Catherine is civil, but Nelly's conscience is disturbed.

After the birthday party, Dickens and Collins arrive and take her to the house that Collins shares with his mistress Caroline Graves (Michelle Fairley) and her daughter. There, Nelly sees the kind of arrangement Dickens may have in mind for her. Later, in the carriage outside her cottage, she confronts Dickens about the suggested arrangement and of being his whore. After apologising and confessing that he no longer loves his wife, Dickens accompanies Nelly inside and comforts her. Soon after, Dickens announces in The Times his "amicable" separation from his wife while boldly denying the rumours of an affair with Nelly. Dickens' wife and children are devastated by the news.

In the coming days, Nelly's mother assures her that he is an honourable man, while Collins reminds her that he is a great man and urges her to break from old conventions. When she visits Dickens at his home, he assures her that he has broken with the past and shows her the manuscript of a new novel that he's just completed, Great Expectations. After reading it, Nelly expresses her approval of the ending which does not bring Estella and Pip together. Dickens reads to her from the novel as if speaking directly to her: 
Dickens and Nelly become lovers, and she finds happiness as his mistress and companion. They spend time in France and she becomes pregnant, but the child dies during birth. After saving a lock of the child's hair, Dickens signs the death certificate "M. Charles Tringham". After returning to England from France in the spring of 1865, Dickens and Nelly board a train at Folkestone headed for London. Near Staplehurst in Kent, the train derails killing ten passengers. Dickens goes to Nelly, who has been thrown from the carriage, and then with her encouragement, pretends that he was travelling alone, to avoid the scandal of it being known they were travelling together. Dickens leaves Nelly in the care of others to tend to the injured and dying along the train. Nelly observes him retrieve a manuscript page of an episode of Our Mutual Friend on which he had been working.

In the coming years, Nelly remains his secret mistress until his death in 1870. In 1876, she marries Oxford graduate George Wharton-Robinson, twelve years her junior. The couple have a son and run a boys' school at Margate. While knowing that she knew Charles Dickens as a child, George does not suspect that she was his mistress. Only the Reverend Benham knows her secret. As she watches her son perform in a school play, she remembers the epilogue lines she spoke on stage in The Frozen Deep for Dickens:

Cast
 Ralph Fiennes as Charles Dickens
 Felicity Jones as Nelly Ternan
 Kristin Scott Thomas as Mrs. Ternan
 Tom Hollander as Wilkie Collins
 Joanna Scanlan as Catherine Dickens
 Michelle Fairley as Caroline Graves
 Jonathan Harden as Mr. Arnott
 Tom Burke as Mr. George Wharton Robinson
 Perdita Weeks as Maria Ternan
 Michael Marcus as Charley Dickens
 John Kavanagh as Reverend Benham
 Amanda Hale as Fanny Ternan

Production
Headline Pictures' Stewart Mackinnon first acquired the film rights to Claire Tomalin's biography and commissioned Abi Morgan to write the screenplay with development funding from BBC Films and the British Film Institute. The screenplay was written and Mackinnon then approached a number of co-producers and directors before contracting Gabrielle Tana, who had worked with Fiennes on Coriolanus, his directorial debut. She proposed the project to Fiennes in 2010, after he finished Coriolanus. Headline then contracted Fiennes and Tana. Fiennes' participation as director was announced in July 2011. He did not know much about Dickens before taking on the project: "I was ignorant. I had only read Little Dorrit. I knew his obvious ones—Nicholas Nickleby, Oliver Twist, Great Expectations—through adaptations. And Christmas Carol. I didn't know much about the man."

Fiennes initially approached another actor to play the role of Dickens but it did not work out and he eventually played the part. He worked closely with Abi Morgan on the script and little by little he warmed to the idea of playing Dickens. Fiennes and Morgan often met with Tomalin who provided guidance, but she wished to remain outside the actual screenwriting.  The screenplay is structured around a series of "small tragedies and moments of catalyst" described in Tomalin's book, which defined their affair according to her. The actresses considered for the role of Nelly Ternan included Carey Mulligan, Abbie Cornish, and Felicity Jones. Jones was officially cast in December 2011. Her casting occurred before Fiennes agreed to portray Dickens.

Principal photography began in April 2012 with a planned filming schedule of ten weeks in Kent and London. Exteriors were shot at Camber Sands which stood in for Margate where the 1870s scenes were set. Filming also took place for two days at Leavesden Film Studios in Hertfordshire.

The film had an operating budget of £12 million.

ReleaseThe Invisible Woman premiered at the Telluride Film Festival on 31 August 2013. The first trailer was launched on 4 October 2013. The film had a limited release in the United States on 25 December 2013 and opened in the United Kingdom on 7 February 2014.

Reception
Box officeThe Invisible Woman earned £1,026,591.43 ($1,373,682) at the Box Office in the United Kingdom and $1,229,853 in the United States. The total worldwide gross was £2,380,130.78 ($3,184,853).

Critical response
Review aggregator Rotten Tomatoes calculated a 75% approval rating, with an average score of 6.73/10, based on 158 reviews. The website's critical consensus reads, "Its deliberate pace will frustrate some viewers, but for fans of handsomely mounted period drama, The Invisible Woman offers visual as well as emotional cinematic nourishment." On review aggregator Metacritic, the film holds a weighted average score of 75/100, based on 41 reviews from mainstream critics, indicating "generally favorable reviews".

In his review on the Roger Ebert website, Godfrey Cheshire gave the film three and a half out of four stars, calling it "a formidable achievement for Fiennes as both actor and director". Cheshire wrote that the story is told with "extraordinary delicacy and cinematic intelligence" and with a "finely calibrated poetic obliqueness that draws the viewer into the relationship's gradual unfolding". Cheshire continued:

Cheshire also praised the performances of the leading actors, including Fiennes who "creates an exuberant portrait of Dickens that encompasses his vanity and selfishness as well as his bounteousness and thirst for life", Jones who is "luminous" and "conveys the young woman's mix of awe, intoxication and anxiety as she is drawn inexorably into the orbit of a powerful older man", and Scanlan who shows Catherine Dickens' "dignity and grace in heart-rending circumstances". Cheshire concluded:

In his review for The Guardian, Peter Bradshaw gave the film four out of five stars, calling the film "piercingly intimate and intelligent" and praises Fiennes for his "strength as a director" and for his "richly sanguine" portrayal of Charles Dickens. Bradshaw also praises Scanlan for her "shrewd and sensitive performance as Dickens's neglected wife". Bradshaw concluded, "This is an engrossing drama, with excellent performances and tremendous design by Maria Djurkovic."

In his review for The Telegraph, Tim Robey gave the film four out of five stars. Robey focused on the acting performances, especially Scanlan who "gives arguably the standout performance in this generally smashing cast ... in two perfectly weighted, emotionally crushing scenes".

In his review in the New York Observer'', Rex Reed called the film "a cogently written and elegantly appointed period piece that relates passages in his books to emotions in his personal life, holding the attention and shedding light on one of literature’s most fascinating footnotes".

Notes

References

Further reading

External links

 
 
 
 
 
 

2013 films
2013 biographical drama films
2013 romantic drama films
Biographical films about writers
British biographical drama films
British romantic drama films
Cultural depictions of Charles Dickens
Films directed by Ralph Fiennes
Films scored by Ilan Eshkeri
Films set in 1857
Films shot at Warner Bros. Studios, Leavesden
Films set in Kent
Films shot in Hertfordshire
Films shot in Kent
Films shot in London
2010s English-language films
2010s British films